Agatha Kong Hoi-ka (born 21 January 1988), better known by her stage name AGA, is a Hong Kong singer-songwriter. She debuted under Universal Music Hong Kong in 2013 with the song "Hello".

Life and career 

AGA was born in Hong Kong on 21 January 1988. She has two older sisters Catherine and Regina, who died from cancer in 2015.

Prior to becoming a singer, AGA worked as a flight attendant, hoping to save enough money to study music abroad. After being discovered by renown Hong Kong producer Schuman, she began composing demos for him. Her first song to be used by a singer was Stephanie Cheng's "The Fifth Kind". In 2012 she signed with Universal Music Hong Kong as a singer. She made her debut as a solo artist in 2013 with the single "Hello". Her debut eponymous EP was released digitally on 2 September 2013. AGA won the Best Newcomer Award Gold Prize at the 2013 Ultimate Song Chart Awards.

She returned to the charts with the single "One" in July 2014. One was a critical success, topping all four major music charts in Hong Kong. AGA recorded a duet version of the song with singer Gin Lee, titled "One Plus One". One was released as a 3-inch CD single on 11 November, containing the original, duet, and voiceover version (which featured renown singer Eason Chan). "One" was awarded Top Ten Song at the 2014 Ultimate Song Chart Awards and Most Played Song at the 2014 Metro Radio Hit Music Awards.

In 2015, to commemorate the death of her sister due to cancer, she wrote the song "If". "If" was released as a single.

Ginadoll was released 14 March 2016 and was certified gold.

AGA released her album "Luna" on 22 January 2018. Record sales have achieved good results, winning the sales charts of major record shops and streaming music platforms respectively. "Luna" has also been on the Hong Kong Recording Association's sales charts for 16 weeks, with 2 weeks becoming the champion, making AGA and Queen Miriam Yeung the longest female singer on the list in 2018. The popularity of "Indefinite" and "Small Question" made AGA win the 2018 Best Music Chart Awards Ceremony "Professional Promotion. Top 10 Best 7" and the 41st Top Ten Chinese Golden Melody Awards Ceremony " "Top Ten Chinese Golden Songs", and AGA won the "Bronze Award for Female Singer in the Orchestra", "Silver Award for Singer and Singer in the Orchestra" and the "Outstanding Pop Singer Award" for the first time.

AGA released the single "Tonight" in early 2019, which became the "Three Channel Champion Song". The single "Two at a Time" was released at the end of 2019 and became the "Three Channel Champion Song". The popularity of "Tonight" made AGA win the 42nd Top Ten Chinese Golden Melody Awards Ceremony with the song "Top Ten Chinese Golden Melody". In addition, AGA won the "Best Female Singer" for the first time and won the "Bronze Award for Female Singer" , "Silver Award for Outstanding Musician Singer" and "Outstanding Pop Singer Award".

AGA was originally scheduled to hold her first Hong Kong concert "AGA Round Midnight Live 2020" in April 2020 but cancelled after the outbreak of coronavirus.

Despite this, she still insisted on creating during the epidemic, and even participated in the work behind the scenes of the music video for the song "See You Next Time"; she also produced the second melody written in life "I don't love this song" It is the song "So Called Love Song". The three songs are all included in the fully composed album "So Called Love Songs" released on 28 September of the same year. In October, AGA was nominated for the Most Popular Artist in Greater China at the 2020 MTV European Music Awards, becoming the only Hong Kong singer shortlisted for that year. Although she failed to win the award, she was also awarded the "Best Musician Singer-Composer Gold Award" and "Best Musician Female Singer" in the 2020 Best Musical Pop Chart Awards Ceremony. Gold Award" and "See You Next Time" won the sixth place in "Professional Recommendations. Top Ten"

Discography
AGA (2013)
ONE (EP) (2014)
Ginadoll (2016)
Luna (2018)
So Called Love Songs (2020)
AGA's Love Episode #1 (2021)
Here and There (Live) (2021)

References

External links
AGA's YouTube Channel

1988 births
Living people
Cantopop singers
English-language singers from Hong Kong
Hong Kong people of Filipino descent
21st-century Hong Kong women singers
Cantopop singer-songwriters
Hong Kong singer-songwriters
Hong Kong women singer-songwriters
Universal Music Hong Kong artists